Aditya Narayan Purohit (born 30 July 1940) is an Indian scientist and professor who has mainly worked on ecophysiology of tree species and physiology of high altitude medicinal plants. He was born in village Kimni, Dist. Chamoli.
He has served as the Vice-Chancellor of Hemwati Nandan Bahuguna Garhwal University and as director of the university's High Altitude Plant Physiology Research Center.
He was also the Director of Govind Ballabh Pant Institute of Himalayan Environment and Development from 1990 to 1995.
Purohit was awarded Padma Shri, the fourth highest civilian award of India, by the President of India in 1997 for his valuable scientific contribution in Indian mountains.

Personal life
Purohit was born in Kimni, Chamoli district, Uttarakhand, India.
He had his early education in Tharali and Rudraprayag in Chamoli district, Lansdowne in Pauri district, Nainital and research studies in Panjab University Chandigarh.

He worked at Forest Research Institute Dehradun, Panjab University Chandigarh, Central Potato Research Institute, Shimla, the University of British Columbia and North Eastern Hill University, Shillong before joining H.N.B. Garhwal University in 1977.
He has travelled all over the world to deliver lecturers and seminars in various conferences. He is married to Malti Purohit; they have a daughter and a son.

After joining HNB Garhwal University, Purohit initiated work on high altitude plants. He established an institute with its alpine field station at 13000-ft elevation at Tungnath, which is the first Alpine Center in India. The work conducted at this centre has revealed that high altitude species are less sensitive than the low altitude species to the environmental stresses. The germination studies of alpine plants made by Purohit and his associates have helped in germinating many endangered species and establishing them in nature in the alpine field station at Tungnath. He and his associates have come up with the cultivation technology for Aconites, alpine and sub-alpine plants of very high medicinal value, where yield is increased 10 to 12 fold. He has made valuable scientific contribution on mountain plants and the mountain ecosystem. After retiring from H.N.B. Garhwal University in 2002, he was offered the special chair by Government of Uttarakhand to advice on conservation, development and cultivation of medicinal and aromatic plants in the State. He has established a Centre for Aromatic Plants for the State.

He was the member of Board of Governors, International Centre for Integrated Mountain Development (ICIMOD), Nepal from 1991 to 1997; Member, Initial Organizing Committee of International Mountain Forum from 1995 to 1997. He is also the member of editorial board for the Journal of Sustainable Forestry.
Besides being the member of several national committees, Purohit was the member of the group constituted by the Planning Commission, Govt. of India to formulate the national policy for the development of Himalayan region. He was instrumental in preparing the action plan for the Himalayan region, which was approved by the Indian Parliament in 1992.

Positions held
2010 onwards: Adjunct Professor, School of Environmental Studies, Doon University, Dehradun
 2003 -2010: "Sri M.L. Bhartia Chair for Conservation, Development and Promotion of Medicinal and Aromatic Plants in Uttaranchal" Government of Uttaranchal
 2001–2002: Vice- Chancellor, H.N.B. Garhwal University, Srinagar Garhwal, India
 1990–1995: Director, G.B. Pant Institute of Himalayan Environment & Development, (Autonomous Institute of Ministry of Environment & Forests, Govt. of India) Almora, U.P., India
 1995–2002: Professor and Director, High Altitude Plant Physiology Research Centre, Garhwal University, Srinagar, U.P., India, March, 1985 to August 1990 and from September 1995 till June, 2002.
 1979 – 1985Reader, Department : of Botany and Director, High Altitude Plant Physiology Research Centre, Garhwal University, Srinagar, U.P. India
 1976–1979: Reader and Head, Department of Botany, Garhwal University, Srinagar, U.P., India, 1976–78 and Reader, October 1978 – July 1979.
 1975–1976: Reader in Plant Physiology, Department of Botany, North-Eastern Hill University, Shillong, India
 1973–1975: Research Associate, Department of Botany, University of British Columbia, Vancouver, Canada
 1969–1972: Plant Physiologist, Sr. Class I, Central Potato Research Institute, ICAR, Simla, India
 1966–1969: Lecturer, Department of Botany, Punjab University, Chandigarh, India
 1965–1966: Research Officer, Department of Botany, Punjab University, Chandigarh, India
 1961–1963: Research Assistant, Plant Physiology, Forest Research Institute, Dehradun, India

Professional services (national)

 2002: Chairman, Apex Committee on Technology Vision 2020 (Agriculture), TIFAC, Department of Science and Technology, Govt. of India
 1992: Member, Expert Group to formulate the National Policy for Development of Himalayan region, Planning Commission, Govt. of India
 1991–1994: Member, Project Assessment Committee (Plant Sciences) Department of Science & Technology, Govt. of India
 1989–1990: Member of Science Advisory Committee forG.B. Pant Institute of Himalayan Environment and Development
 1988: Chairman- Working Group on "Science & Technology based programmes for environmental sound development of special areas for 8th Plan", Planning Commission
 1985: Member- Task Force for 7th Plan, U.P. Hills, Govt. of U.P. Lucknow
 1984 onwards: Member- Expert Group on Eco-development, Department of Environment, Govt. of India
 1982–1989: Member- Expert Group on Biomass, Department of Non-Conventional Energy Sources, Govt. of India
 1982–1985: Member- ICAR Plant Physiology and Biochemistry Panel, for three years, March
 1981–1984: Member- Expert Committee of DST, Govt. of India for Science and Technology for SC & ST
 1980–1983: Member – Gandhi Peace Foundation Environmental Committee
 1977–78: Convener – Task Force Committee for High Altitude Plant Conservation, ICAR Sub-Committee for North-Western Humid Himalaya
 1976–1979: Member – ICAR Plant Physiology and Biochemistry Panel

Professional services (international)

 Member Editorial Board, Journal of Sustainable Forestry, The Haworth Press, Inc, USA.
 Member Board of Governors, International Centre for Integrated Mountain Development (ICIMOD) Nepal, 1991–1997.
 Member, Initial Organizing Committee for International Mountain Forum established during NGO Consultation Meeting held in Lima, Peru, 1995.
 Consultant for Winrock International (Short-term), on Forestry Research & Education Project, ICFRE, India, 1997

Contribution to science and technology development
Purohit has worked mainly on ecophysiology of tree species and physiology of high altitude medicinal plants.

Purohit demonstrated for the first time that the indeterminate species can be made determinate. Based on this observation, he proposed that it is the channelization of food factors and the reproductive hormones, which controls the indeterminate or determinate nature of the plants. Prof. Purohit has shown a close relationship between photosystem I and onset of generative phase, which he has explained in terms of the energy requirement as a prelude to generative phase. He has proposed that evocation in leaves leading to the onset of floral induction starts with biophysical processes relating to the excitation of molecules in response to light and oxidation-reduction state of reaction centre pigments.

Purohit worked out the dynamics of shoot elongation and expansion showing recurrent growth pattern and reported appreciable histological changes in the shoot apex during longest period of dormancy and onset of reproductive phase, which was the first report of such developmental process in trees.
He studied the effect of  enrichment and reported that high concentration of  inhibits flowering in classical short day plants and induces flowering in long day plants and even the phytochrome mediated responses in flowering are associated with the presence of  during red light interruption. He also reported for the first time that  enrichment also affects viral multiplication.

Purohit and his associates have added valuable information to the scientific field with respect to the applied value of variations in leaf temperatures in plants. They have identified two groups of tree species; namely under and over temperature tree species. According to their findings under temperature species have higher survival potential on highly exposed subtropical mountain slopes with high temperature and irradiance. Based on physiological parameters, he worked out the superiority index for selection of tree species for plantation in mountains and their fuel wood value index.

Purohit's study on large cardamum and mandarin based agroforestry systems in Sikkim revealed: (1) acceleration of nutrient cycling under the influence of  fixing trees, (2) greater release of nutrients from non--fixer letter and (3) solubilisation of secondarily fixed phosphorus by Alnus and Albizia. These findings have great significance in agroforestry model development.

After joining Garhwal University, Purohit initiated work on the physiology of high altitude plants. He established a High Altitude Plant Physiology Research Centre with its alpine field station at 13000-ft elevation at Tungnath. The work conducted at this centre has reveals that high altitude species are less sensitive than the low altitude species to the environmental stresses. He has reported "Pseudomonocotyle" and regulatory role of cotyledons in the growth of epicotyle in some of the alpine dicot species. The germination studies of alpine plants made by Purohit and his associates have helped in germinating many endangered species and establishing them in nature in the alpine field station at Tungnath. He and his associates have come up with the cultivation technology for Aconites, alpine and sub-alpine plants of very high medicinal value, where yield is increased 10 to 12 fold.

Purohit helped the government of India in establishing G.B. Pant Institute of Himalayan Environment and Development. The institute has its units all over Indian Himalaya. With the assistance of all the staff members of the institute, Purohit prepared a based document entitled "Action Plan for Himalaya" which forms the base document for the sustainable development of the Himalayan region. During his tenure, he initiated number of programmes in Himalayan region Badrivan Restoration with the help of pilgrims was one of the unique programme which has been cited internationally as a model for restoration of religious places all over the World.

For his valuable scientific contribution in Indian mountains, Purohit was awarded Padma Shri by the President of India in 1997.

Books edited
 Views on Physiology of Flowering, 1978 (with R. Gurumurti)
 Conservation and Management of Biological Resources in Himalaya, 1996 (with P.S. Ramakrishnan, K.G. Saxena, K.S. Rao and R.K. Maikhuri)
 Harvesting the Herbs -2000, 1997 (with A.R. Nautiyal and M.C. Nautiyal)

Popular publications
 Blossoming Garhwal Himalaya, 1985
 Murmuring Man: Man in search of environmentally sound development, 1995

He has published more than 175 papers and has guided 20 research scholars.

Awards and professional recognition
 1969: J.J. Chinoy Gold Medal for the best piece of research work published in Indian Journal of Plant Physiology
 1975: Elected Member of Institute of Biology, London
 1989: Fellow of National Academy of Sciences, India (NASI)
 1992: Fellow of National Academy of Agricultural Sciences, India
 1992: SICO- Sponsored Award for Environmental Sciences by National Academy of Sciences, India, 1992 for outstanding work on Mountain Environment.
 1992: Seth Memorial Award – 1992 for contribution in Tree Ecophysiology, by Indian Society of Tree Scientists.
 1984: Fellow of Indian National Science Academy (INSA)
 1996: Vir Keshri Environment – Conservation Award – 1996, by Citizens Council, Dehra Dun, U.P.
 1996: Om Prakash Bhasin Foundation Award in Agriculture for the Advancement in Science & Technology
 1997: Padma Shri Award by President of India for outstanding contribution in Plant Sciences
 2003: Birbal Sahni Birth Centenary Award for the year 2002–2003 by The Indian Science Congress Association for the outstanding contribution to the advancement of science in India.
 2012: Shiksha Ratna Award by University of Petroleum & Energy Studies
 2014: Dev Bhoomi Samman by Zee Sangam.
 2014: RN Tandon Memorial Award by National Academy of Sciences India
 2015 : Lifetime Achievement Award by Indian Society of Plant Physiology, New Delhi

References

External links
 Adityapurohit.com
 Hnbgu.ac.in
 Gbpihed.gov.in

Recipients of the Padma Shri in science & engineering
Fellows of the Indian National Science Academy
Garhwali people
People from Chamoli district
Indian ecologists
Plant physiologists
1940 births
Living people
Scientists from Dehradun
Fellows of The National Academy of Sciences, India
Fellows of the National Academy of Agricultural Sciences
20th-century Indian botanists